Xavier Chiocci, born 13 February 1990 in Toulon, France, is a French rugby union player who represents Toulon in the Top 14.

Biography
He first began his playing career in 2000 when playing for RC La Valette, and did so until 2007. During that time he represented the French Under-18's team in the European Under-18 Rugby Union Championship, where he earned multiple success; helping the team to European Champions in 2007 and 2008. In 2007, he joined Toulon for the 2007–08 Rugby Pro D2 season as an academy player, a position he was in until 2011. However, between joining the club in 2007 and making has debut in 2011, he played for the French Under-20s team in 2009 and 2010, helping France to 5th in the 2010 IRB Junior World Championship.

In 2011 he appeared for the first time as a full-time Toulon player. He made his debut on 10 November 2011 against Petrarca during the 2011–12 European Challenge Cup, Toulon was the victors on that occasion winning 53–22. He became a more consistent player in the 2012–13 Season, though he made most of his 21 appearances off the bench after consistently being behind English Prop Andrew Sheridan. However, an injury to Sheridan during the 2013–14 Season, saw Chiocci start in almost every match of the season, including the 23–6 win over Saracens in the 2014 Heineken Cup Final at the Millennium Stadium, Cardiff.

His form between 2012 and 2014 saw Chiocci called up to the France national team for the 2014 November Test matches against Fiji, Australia and Argentina. He debuted off the bench in the 40–15 win over Fiji.

References

External links
 
 Toulon profile
 

1990 births
Living people
French rugby union players
Rugby union props
RC Toulonnais players
French people of Italian descent
France international rugby union players
Sportspeople from Toulon
Lyon OU players